The Oldfield white-bellied rat or soft-furred Taiwan niviventer (Niviventer culturatus) is a species of phat rat in the family Muridae. It is found only in Taiwan. It has also been considered a subspecies of Niviventer niviventer and included in Niviventer confucianus.

Description
They are dorsally dark grayish brown and ventrally creamy white; there is a sharp border between the dorsal and ventral coloration. The tail is similarly bicolored except for the terminal portion that is entirely white. The face is rather grayish but has dark patches just in front of and behind the eyes. The digits are white.

Habitat
It can be locally common and is found in the Yushan National Park.

References

Niviventer
Mammals of Taiwan
Endemic fauna of Taiwan
Mammals described in 1917
Taxa named by Oldfield Thomas
Taxonomy articles created by Polbot